The Tungatinah Power Station is a conventional hydroelectric power station located in the Central Highlands region of Tasmania, Australia. The power station is situated on the Upper River Derwent catchment and is owned and operated by Hydro Tasmania.

Technical details

Part of the Derwent scheme that comprises eleven hydroelectric power stations, the Tungatinah Power Station is the second station in the scheme, adjacent to the Nive River. The power station is located aboveground adjacent to the Nive River. The headworks are quite complex with several dams (including the Bronte Lagoon formed by Bronte Dam, Bradys Lake formed by Bradys Dam, Lake Binney and the Tungatinah Lagoon), a tunnel, canals, pipelines, flumes their associated control gates and a pump station. Water is diverted from the Tungatinah Lagoon by a short tunnel with surge shaft and then descends  through five steel penstocks to the power station.

Within the station building, each turbine has a semi-embedded spiral casing and water flow is controlled via a spherical rotary inlet valve and a relief valve designed to prevent spiral casing over pressure. The station output, estimated to be  annually, is fed to TasNetworks' transmission grid via five 11 kV/110 kV three-phase GEC generator transformer to the outdoor switchyard.

After passing through the five turbines, water is discharged into the Nive River where it combines with the water from the Tarraleah Power Station to supply the six Lower Derwent stations.

See also 

List of power stations in Tasmania

References

External links
Hydro Tasmania page on the Lower Derwent

Energy infrastructure completed in 1953
Energy infrastructure completed in 1956
Hydroelectric power stations in Tasmania
Central Highlands (Tasmania)